Robin Belfield is a British theatre writer, director and producer. He has worked with the National Theatre, the Royal Welsh College of Music and Drama, The Oxford School of Drama and the Guildhall School of Music and Drama.

Education
Robin Belfield grew up in Royston, Hertfordshire, where he attended Icknield Walk First School, Greneway Middle School and Meridian School. Belfield later graduated from the University of Bristol.

Career
Belfield gained a bursary from the Channel 4 Theatre Director Scheme.

In 2008, Belfield directed the Show of Strength Theatre Company's production Trade It?, which comprised ten-minute dramas set in forgotten locations around Bristol.

He met composer Simon Slater in 2010 when they worked together on a production of Treasure Island at the Watermill Theatre in Newbury, Berkshire.

Belfield and Slater's 2014/2015 adaptation of Peter Pan at the Watermill Theatre was well received. The British Theatre Guide's Robin Strapp described it as "the perfect start to the festive season" before adding, "Once again, the partnership of director and writer Robin Belfield and Simon Slater, who also composed the vibrant music, have come up trumps in this hugely enjoyable and pacey adaption of J M Barrie’s classic story".

References

British theatre directors
British theatre managers and producers
Living people
People from Royston, Hertfordshire
Alumni of the University of Bristol
Year of birth missing (living people)